Ronald George Harris (16 September 1932 – 1 February 2013) was an Australian cricket umpire. He stood in one ODI game in 1979.

See also
 List of One Day International cricket umpires

References

1932 births
2013 deaths
Australian One Day International cricket umpires